The Mines in the Battle of Messines comprised a series of underground explosive charges which were  fired during the First World War at the start of the Battle of Messines  by the British Second Army (General Sir Herbert Plumer) near the village of Mesen (Messines in French, historically also used in English and  German) in Belgian West Flanders. The mines, secretly planted and maintained by British tunnelling units beneath the forward position of the German 4th Army (General Friedrich Bertram Sixt von Armin), killed approximately 10,000 German soldiers and created  craters. Their joint explosion ranks among the largest non-nuclear explosions of all time.

The evening before the attack, General Sir Charles Harington, Chief of Staff of the Second Army, remarked to the press, "Gentlemen, I don’t know whether we are going to make history tomorrow, but at any rate we shall change geography". The Battle of Messines marked the zenith of mine warfare. Just over two months later, on 10 August 1917, the Royal Engineers fired the last British deep mine of the war, at Givenchy-en-Gohelle near Arras.

Background

British mining, 1915–1916

The concept of a deep mining offensive was devised in September 1915 by the Engineer-in-Chief of the British Expeditionary Force (BEF), Brigadier George Fowke, who proposed to drive galleries  underground. Fowke had been inspired by the thinking of Major John Norton-Griffiths, a civil engineer, who had helped form the first tunnelling companies and introduced the quiet clay kicking technique.

In September, Fowke proposed to dig under the Ploegsteert–Messines (Mesen), Kemmel–Wytschaete (Wijtschate) and Vierstraat–Wytschaete roads and to dig two tunnels between the Douve river and the south-east end of Plugstreet (Ploegsteert) Wood, the objectives to be reached in three to six months. The scheme devised by Fowke was formally approved on 6 January 1916, although Fowke and his deputy, Colonel R. N. Harvey, had already begun the preliminaries. By January, several deep mine shafts, marked as "deep wells" and six tunnels had been started. Sub-surface conditions were especially complex and separate ground water tables made mining difficult. To overcome the technical difficulties, two military geologists assisted the miners from March, including Edgeworth David, who planned the system of mines.

Co-ordinated by the Royal Engineers, the mine galleries were dug by the British 171st, 175th and 250th Tunnelling companies and the 1st Canadian, 3rd Canadian and 1st Australian Tunnelling companies, while the British 183rd, 2nd Canadian and 2nd Australian Tunnelling companies built dugouts (underground shelters) in the Second Army area. German tunnellers came within metres of several British mine chambers and, well before the Battle of Messines, found La Petite Douve Farm mine. The British diverted the attention of German miners from their deepest galleries by making many minor attacks in the upper levels.

Prelude

British mining, 1917

A group of four mines was placed under the German strongpoint Birdcage at Le Pelerin, just outside Ploegsteert Wood.

The mine at Ontario Farm did not produce a crater but left a shallow indentation in the soft clay, after wet sand flowed back into the crater. Birdcage 1–4 on the extreme southern flank in the II Anzac Corps area, were not required because the Germans made a local retirement before 7 June. Peckham 2 was abandoned due to a tunnel collapse and the mine at La Petite Douve Farm was abandoned after the German camouflet blast of  The evening before the attack, Harington, the Second Army Chief of Staff, remarked to the press, "Gentlemen, we may not make history tomorrow, but we shall certainly change the geography".

German mining, 1916–1917

In December 1916,  Füßlein, commander of German mining operations in the salient, had recorded that British deep mining was intended to support an offensive above ground and received three more mining companies, to fight in the British lower as well as the upper mine systems and had gained some success. In April 1917, the 4th Army (General Friedrich Bertram Sixt von Armin) received information from air reconnaissance that a British offensive was being prepared in the Messines Ridge sector, and a spy reported to OHL that if the offensive at Arras was frustrated, the British would transfer their effort to Flanders. A voluntary retirement would avoid the calamity experienced by the defenders at the Battle of Vimy Ridge on 9 April.

Kuhl proposed a retirement to the  Line (Oosttaverne Line to the British), halfway back from the Second Line along the ridge or all the way back to the Third Line (Warneton Line). At a conference with 4th Army commanders to discuss the defence of Messines Ridge on 30 April, most of them rejected the suggestion, because they considered that the defences had been modernised, were favourable for a mobile defence and convenient for counter-attacks. The artillery commander of  said that the German guns were well-organised and could overcome British artillery. The divisional commanders were encouraged by a report by Füßlein on 28 April, that the counter-mining had been such a success, particularly recently that

For this and other reasons the withdrawal proposal was dropped as impractical. Soon after the conference, Füßlein changed his mind and on 10 May, reported to the 4th Army his suspicions that the British might have prepared several deep mines, including ones at Hill 60, Caterpillar, St Eloi, Spanbroekmolen and Kruisstraat and predicted that if an above-ground offensive began, there would be big mine explosions in the vicinity of the German front line.

On 19 May, the 4th Army concluded that the greater volume of British artillery fire was retaliation for the increase in German bombardments and although defensive preparations were to continue, no attack was considered imminent. On 24 May, Füßlein was more optimistic about German defensive measures and Laffert wrote later, that the possibility of mine explosions was thought remote and if encountered they would have only local effect, as the front trench system was lightly held. From 12 May, weekly reports by the 4th Army made no mention of mining and Rupprecht made no reference to it after the end of the month.

Battle: 7 June 1917
The British artillery fire lifted half an hour before dawn and as they waited in the silence for the offensive to begin, some of the troops reportedly heard a nightingale singing. Starting from 3:17 a.m. on 7 June, the mines at Messines were fired within the space of 20 seconds. The joint explosion ranks among the largest non-nuclear explosions, surpassing the mines on the first day of the Somme fired 11 months before. The sound of the blast was considered the loudest man-made noise in history. Reports suggested that the sound was heard in London and Dublin; at the Lille University geology department, the shock wave was mistaken for an earthquake. Some witnesses described "pillars of fire", although many also conceded that the scene was indescribable.

That the detonations were not simultaneous enhanced their effect on the German troops. Strange acoustic effects also added to the panic – German troops on Hill 60 thought that the Kruisstraat and Spanbroekmolen mines were under Messines village, which was well behind the front line, while some British troops thought that they were German counter-mines going off under the British support trenches. The combined explosion is considered to have killed more people than any other non-nuclear man-made explosion in history; it killed approximately 10,000 German soldiers between Ypres and Ploegsteert. The historian Simon Jones challenged the death toll of the mines using primary sources and suggested that the mine explosions killed hundreds of German troops and that the 10,000 was the 21-day casualty total ending on 10 June, 7,200 of whom were captured by the British, recorded in Der Weltkrieg, the German official history, mistakenly taken by British writers to be the result of the mine explosions.

Aftermath

Two days after the battle, the  commander General Maximilian von Laffert was sacked. (He died of a heart attack eleven days later.) The German official history,  (volume XII, 1939), placed the mines, which were unprecedented in size and number, second in a list of five reasons for the German defeat. In an after-action report, Laffert wrote that had the extent of the mine danger been suspected, a withdrawal from the front trench system to the  Line, half-way between the first and second positions, would have been ordered before the attack, since the cost inflicted on the British by having to fight for the ridge justified its retention. In 1929, Hermann von Kuhl lamented the failure to overrule the 4th Army commanders on 30 April and prevent "one of the worst tragedies of the war".

List of the mines

Gallery

See also

 Mining (military)
 The War Below
 Beneath Hill 60
 Mines on the first day of the Somme
 Mines on the Italian Front (World War I)

Notes

Citations

References

Books
 
 
 
 
 
 
 
 
 
 
 
 
 
 
 

Journals
 

Newspapers
 

Websites

Further reading
 
 
 Goodbody, A. (2016), "Tunnelling in the deep: Battle of Messines" , in: Mining Magazine, 13 September 2016, London: Aspermont Media.

External links

 Tunnelling companies RE
 Messines Ridge photo essay
 AOH Appendix 1 The Mines at Hill 60
 Map of the mines
 Messines with images of the craters
 With the British Army in Flanders
 Battle of Messines Ridge with images of the craters
 Discussions of mines that were not fired
 The Western Front Today, Messines

1917 in Belgium
1917 in France
Explosions in 1917
Messines 1917
Messines 1917
Messines 1917
Ypres Salient